ATW may refer to:

Technology
 Accelerator transmutation of waste, a way of processing radioactive waste
 Atari Transputer Workstation, a computer produced in 1980s
 Asynchronous TimeWarp, a technique used in virtual reality headsets

Entertainment
 All Too Well, a song written by American singer-songwriter Taylor Swift and Liz Rose and Performed by the former
 Access 31, a former Perth television station with callsign ATW, now replaced by West TV
 Air Transport World, a magazine
 Ansem the Wise, a character from the Kingdom Hearts series
 American Travelways, a fictional airline in the 1986 film The Delta Force
 ATW (album), an album by All Them Witches

Organizations
 American Theatre Wing, a theatre education organization
 Arriva Trains Wales, a former train operating company in the United Kingdom
 Atlantic and Western Railway, in North Carolina, United States

Places
 Agua Tibia Wilderness, a protected area in California
 Appleton International Airport (IATA airport code: ATW), in Appleton, Wisconsin, United States

Other
 Atsugewi language (ISO 639-3: atw), a language of North America